Yoakum is a surname. Notable people with the surname include:

Benjamin Franklin Yoakum (1859-1929), American railroad executive
Charles Henderson Yoakum (1849-1909), U.S. Representative from Texas.
Joseph Elmer Yoakum (1890-1972), self-taught artist of African-American and Native American descent
Delmer J. Yoakum (1915-1996), American artist
Henderson King Yoakum (1810-1856), Texas historian